Antonín Dvořák finished the composition of his String Quartet No. 7 in A minor, Op. 16 (B. 45), on 24 September 1874, having probably started it on or around the 14 September.

Background 
According to Sourek, Dvořák began composition of this quartet in the middle of September 1874, completing the second movement on 17 September, the third on 21 September and the fourth on 24 September. He dedicated the work to the conductor Ľudevít Procházka. It was first performed at a meeting of the "Circle of Young Musicians" on 17 June 1875, and publicly at a concert of the "Society for Chamber Music" in Prague, on 29 December 1878, the performers on this occasion being Antonin Bennewitz, Eduard Wittich, Vilem Bauer and Bruno Wilfert. The quartet was published in parts by Emanuel Stary of Prague in 1875, and in score and parts by Bote & Bock of Berlin in 1893. Its duration is around  minutes.

Structure 
The quartet is in four movements, as follows:

Notes

References 

 p. 69
See also:  English language version of page about Dvorak's String Quartet No 7 at a Czech site

Dvorak 07
1874 compositions
Compositions in A minor